Gagame Feni  is a Solomon Islands footballer who played as a striker for ABM Galaxy in Vanuatu, then for Kossa F.C. in Honiara.

Feni was the top scorer during the 2021 Solomon Islands S-League.

Club 

Cup: Fiji Football Association Cup Tournament, Inter-District Championship, Battle of the Giants and Champion versus Champion

International career

International goals
Scores and results list the Solomon Islands' goal tally first.

References 

1992 births
Living people
Solomon Islands footballers
Solomon Islands international footballers
Association football forwards
People educated at Nayland College
Waitakere United players
Solomon Islands expatriate footballers
Solomon Islands expatriate sportspeople in New Zealand
Expatriate association footballers in New Zealand
ABM Galaxy F.C. players